Jin Ye-sol (born September 24, 1985) is a South Korean actress. She's also the Brand Ambassador for My Cherie Closet (MCC).

Filmography

Television series

Music video appearances

Awards and nominations

References

External links
 at Hunus Entertainment 

South Korean television actresses
South Korean television personalities
Living people
1985 births
Actresses from Seoul
Myongji University alumni
21st-century South Korean actresses